30th Anniversary or 30th Anniversary Collection may refer to:

Music
30th Anniversary (Baccara album)
30th Anniversary Collection (Whitesnake album)
30th Anniversary Collection (Paul Anka album) 1989
30th Anniversary Anthology by The Whispers  1999
30th Anniversary Concert DVD  by Canadian hard rock band Helix

See also
She's So Unusual: A 30th Anniversary Celebration (album) redirects to She's So Unusual 
Thyrty: The 30th Anniversary Collection 30th anniversary album by the southern rock band Lynyrd Skynyrd
The 30th Anniversary Concert Celebration live double-album of Bob Dylan
Howzat! – 30th Anniversary Celebration Collection compilation album by Sherbet released in 1999
Tobaccoland 30th Anniversary Show by Tobaccoland Chorus
30th Anniversary Tour: Live album by George Thorogood and the Destroyers 2004
The 30th Anniversary Concert: Live in Tokyo live video album by the Michael Schenker Group  2010